A Message from Mars is a 1921 American silent fantasy comedy film directed by Maxwell Karger and starring Bert Lytell, Raye Dean, and Maude Milton. It is based on the 1899 play with the same name by Richard Ganthony. The film was released by Metro Pictures on April 11, 1921.

Plot
Wealthy young Horace Parker, who is an egoist agrees to financing a communicating device which allows for communicating with Mars. He is credited for the invention and he studies his plans rather than go to a party with his fiancée, Minnie. After falling asleep, a messenger from Mars appears to Parker who announces his intentions to convert Parker (who according to the messenger is the earth's most selfish man). Parker is then shown poverty and suffering by the messenger and Parker also overhears Minnie's reproval of him at the party. Parker awakens in a house fire inside the home of a soldier that he once refused help to. Parker ends up rescuing the woman and invites her and other unfortunate people to his home which also pleases his fiancée.

Production
A Message from Mars was shot at Metro's studio on 61st Street in Manhattan. No art director is credited for the film; M.P. Staulcup or Lester J. Vermilyea are held up as likely candidates by historian Richard Koszarski, as both were known to work on Metro's New York films.

Cast
 Bert Lytell as Horace Parker
 Raye Dean as Minnie Talbot
 Maude Milton as Martha Parker (*aka Maud Milton)
 Alphonse Ethier as the messenger (credited as Alphonz Ethier)
 Gordon Ash as Arthur Dicey
 Leonard Mudie as Fred Jones
 Mary Louise Beaton as Mrs. Jones
 Frank Currier as Sir Edwards
 George Spink as The butler

Preservation
A print is prepared and preserved by MGM.

References

External links

1920s fantasy comedy films
1920s science fiction comedy films
Metro Pictures films
American fantasy comedy films
American science fiction comedy films
1921 films
American silent feature films
American black-and-white films
American films based on plays
Films directed by Maxwell Karger
1921 comedy films
1920s American films
Silent American comedy films
1920s English-language films
Silent science fiction comedy films
Silent fantasy comedy films